Bauhinia racemosa, commonly known as the bidi leaf tree, is a rare medicinal species of flowering shrub with religious significance. It is native to tropical Southeast Asia.

Religious significance

In Hindu families it is customary to exchange leaves of the Aapta tree on the Hindu festive day of Dussehra. An act known as exchanging Gold—pointing to the special significance of the plant on that particular day. This is also why the tree is often referred to as Sonpatta (literal translation: leaves of gold).

Other uses

The leaves are used in the production of beedi, a thin Indian and Sri Lankan cigarillo.

References

External links

racemosa
Flora of Asia
Plants described in 1785

Plants in Hinduism